Haapsalu Horror and Fantasy Film Festival (abbreviated HÕFF) is an international film festival which annually takes place in Haapsalu, Estonia. HÕFF focuses on horror and fantasy films. HÕFF are organized by Tallinn Black Nights Film Festival, Haapsalu Culture Center and the town of Haapsalu.

First HÕFF took place in 2005.

Since 2012, HÕFF is a member of Méliès International Festivals Federation (MIFF).

Notable premieres
2016 Babak Anvari "Under the Shadow"
2016 Simon Rumley "Johnny Frank Garrett's Last Word"

References

External links

Film festivals in Estonia
Fantasy and horror film festivals